A United States Grand Prix (USGP) is a Grand Prix type race that takes place in the United States. Several racing associates hold their own USGP. The major ones are as follows:

Races named United States Grand Prix:
United States Grand Prix, a Formula 1 race
 United States Grand Prix West, when the US had multiple F1 races
United States Grand Prix (motorcycle)

United States Grand Prix may also refer to:
 Indy 500, between 1950 and 1960, the Indy 500 was an F1 points paying race, but not on the F1 world circuit
 Caesars Palace Grand Prix (LVGP), the third F1 USGP in two seasons
 Detroit Grand Prix
 Dallas Grand Prix
 Grand Prix of America
 Long Beach Grand Prix
 U.S. 500
 US Grand Prix Engineering, a failed US-based Formula One team

See also
 Grand Prix Americas
 American Grand Prix
 Motorcycle Grand Prix of the Americas

de:Großer Preis der USA
es:Gran Premio de los Estados Unidos
eu:Estatu Batuetako Sari Nagusia
fr:Grand Prix automobile des États-Unis
it:Gran Premio degli Stati Uniti
ja:アメリカグランプリ
pl:Grand Prix Stanów Zjednoczonych Formuły 1
pt:Grande Prêmio dos Estados Unidos
fi:Yhdysvaltain Grand Prix
sv:USA:s Grand Prix
vi:Giải đua ô tô Công thức 1 Hoa Kỳ